Santa María de Palautordera is a village and municipality in the comarca of Vallès Oriental in the province of Barcelona and autonomous community of Catalonia, Spain.

Geography
The village is situated in the valley of the River Tordera, at the foot of the Montseny Massif. The vegetation is predominantly pine and oak woods.

Demographics
The population of Santa María de Palautordera as measured by the Town Hall was 9,103 in 2015. The Municipal Population Register has been produced annually since 1998 and demonstrates the change in population:

Transport
Santa María de Palautordera is served by its own station (simply called Palautordera) on the Rodalies de Catalunya regional rail system. The system is currently operated by the Catalan Government.

Notable people
 David Davis Cámara, international handball player for Spain.
 Joan Cañellas, international handball player for Spain.

Twin towns
Santa María de Palautordera is twinned with:

  - Arjona, Jaén, Spain

References

External links
Town Hall website (in Catalan)
 Government data pages 

Municipalities in Vallès Oriental